= Chiang Mai News =

Thai daily newspaper

- Format: Print, online
- Owner(s): Chiang Mai Daily Co., Ltd.
- Founder: Worakorn Tantaranon
- Founded: June 14, 1991
- Language: Thai
- Headquarters: Chiang Mai, Thailand
- Website: www.chiangmainews.co.th

Chiang Mai News (Thai: เชียงใหม่นิวส์) is a news organization in Chiang Mai, Northern Thailand, originally established as a daily print newspaper and now operating primarily online. Founded in 1991, Chiang Mai News is one of the oldest newspapers in northern Thailand and has established itself as a leading source of local news and information for the Northern regions of Thailand.

== History ==
The newspaper was founded on 14 June 1991 by the then-mayor of Chiang Mai and businessman Worakorn Tantranon. It was published by the company Chiang Mai Daily Co., Ltd., and at one point had a daily circulation of approximately 10,000 copies, covering eight provinces in northern Thailand.

In its print era, the paper was known for local-focused content (roughly 70–80% of its news was about Chiang Mai province) and emphasized crime, local politics, society, and tourism rather than national-level competition with Bangkok-based dailies.

On 5 March 2018, the print edition was officially discontinued, and the organization shifted to a fully online publication format, citing changes in reader behavior and increasing consumption of news via digital platforms. The shift to digital was attributed to declining print circulation (from about 40,000 five years earlier to under 20,000 at the end) and changing reader habits. At the time of the transition, the print newspaper had published 9,847 issues in total.

== Operations ==
While in print, Chiang Mai News maintained its own printing press and a full editorial and production staff of over 120 people. Advertising reportedly accounted for about 80% of its revenue, and the newspaper claimed to have the highest level of local advertising in Chiang Mai province. After the transition to digital, the website continues to serve news for Chiang Mai and the broader northern Thailand region, with categories such as regional news, social issues, economy, tourism, entertainment, and lifestyle.
